Old time fiddle is a genre of American folk music. "Old time fiddle tunes" derived from European folk dance tunes such as Jig, Reel, Breakdown, Schottische, Waltz, Two Step and Polka. The fiddle may be accompanied by banjo or other instruments but are nevertheless called "fiddle tunes". The genre traces from the colonization of North America by immigrants from England, France, Germany, Ireland, and Scotland. It is separate and distinct from traditions which it has influenced or which may in part have evolved from it, such as bluegrass, country blues, variants of western swing and country rock.

Starting in the 1920 some fiddlers, particularly younger ones like Aurtur Smith, were swept up in the new music, their style and repertoires reflected influences from blues, ragtime, and Tin Pan Alley. Anyone who wanted to make a career in music had to keep up with the times. But many, like John Salyer and Hiram Stamper cared little for the new music, and stayed with the old-time tunes.

Definition and distinction of old time fiddle
Newer traditions have grown out of old time fiddle music but it retains a separate and distinct identity from those styles. These include bluegrass and Western swing and to some degree country rock. However, the positive statement of what, exactly, constitutes the true and authentic delineation of old time fiddle music is not necessarily unambiguous. Different sources draw a sharper distinction than others, and there is a good deal of overlap which purists will acknowledge to a varying degree. The areas of overlap are primarily with bluegrass, Western swing (Texas swing), country and even rock.

Narrow use of the term 
Art Stamper played in both Appalachia Old Time and bluegrass styles. In autobiographical material posted on his artist website, the writer asserts Stamper's contiguity with "old time and mountain" music, that he learned "the Appalachian fiddle style" from his father, but that "Art also played bluegrass fiddle..." continuing that "Whether playing Appalachian fiddle or bluegrass fiddle, Art was a musical marvel."

Old Time purists
In an essay with the short title Why Old TIme is Different from Bluegrass, Allan Feldman argues against the proposal of an "inclusive cover name that would bring oldtime music, bluegrass, clawgrass and dawg music under the same umbrella in order to attract new audiences. The unfortunate trend in this country is to homogenize things. I think oldtime music stands against homogenization."Having thus staked ground out for himself as a purist, he continues that "he for one celebrates the fact that oldtime music is not bluegrass or dawg music or new grass or even claw grass". He identifies the following categorical distinctions which set Old Time apart:

"Oldtime" works from different tonal centers
 it uses cross tunings
 it uses harmonic resonant overtones
 it uses accidentals
 it mixes non-tempered scales with harmonization
 or it is completely modal.

He continues in direct comparison with  bluegrass or country western, emphasizing the difference between songs which, as opposed to tunes, have lyrics and are primarily for listening rather than for dancing.

 largely dance centered and not song centered
 many of its songs are verses to dance tunes
 most of its songs were meant for solo and unaccompanied performance in their oldest form.

Blending
Although there is considerable published opinion sharply distinguishing Old Time from other genres of fiddle music, there is also area of overlap. Unlike many states which support independent Old Time and bluegrass associations, the Minnesota Bluegrass & Old-Time Music Association intermingles the genres.

Peter Anick is a noted authority on fiddle music genres and is co-author with David Reiner of Old-Time Fiddling Across America and a contributor of feature articles and "Folk Routes" columns for Fiddler magazine. Old Time Fiddling Across America has selections from Northeast, Southeast and Western regions, but also includes in the same volume "ethnic styles" including Cajun, Irish, Scandinavian, Klezmer, and Eastern European fiddling. Also potentially supporting expansive usage is a review of Portland, Oregon's old time Foghorn Stringband in  Lonesome Highway, a "music portal for hard core country, folk, bluegrass, roots, and Americana" characterizes that ostensibly pure Old Time band as "ass kickin' redneck stringband music" with influences from The Carter Family, Kitty Wells and Doc Watson. This blurring of the lines even touches the Vince Gill song named Old Time Fiddle:
I wanna hear an old time fiddle
Play an old time fiddle song
I might even drink just a little
If you play Little Jolie Blon

Repertoire
 Two step
 Breakdown
 Reel
 Jig
 Polka
 Schottische
 Waltz

Traditional old time fiddle tunes
This is a partial listing of the old time repertoire, most of which are in the public domain and have no known authorship. Many of these tunes have rich historical significance.

 Angeline the Baker
The Arkansas Traveler
 Billy in the Lowground
Bonaparte's Retreat
Boil 'em Cabbage Down
Cackling Hen
Casey's Oldtime Waltz
 Cherokee Shuffle
Cluck Old Hen
 Coal Creek March
Coleman's March
 Cotton-Eyed Joe
 Cripple Creek
Cumberland Gap
 Eighth of January
 Fire on the Mountain
 Forked Deer
 Grey Eagle
 Hell Among The Yearlings
 Hell Broke Loose In Georgia
 Jenny Lind
 Katy Hill another old-time tune that has become a standard among bluegrass fiddlers
 Last Gold Dollar
 Leather Britches
 Liberty
 Lost Indian
 Mississippi Sawyer

 Old Joe Clark
 Old Molly Hare
Red Wing
 Sally Ann
Sally Goodin' which is also played in bluegrass as are many Old Time tunes
 Shoot That Turkey Buzzard
Snow Deer
 Soldier's Joy
 Spotted Pony 
 Sugar Hill
 Sugar In The Gourd
 The Sailor's Hornpipe Maritime tune played by old time fiddlers
Turkey in the Straw
 Waltzing in Old San Antone
 What Are You Going to Do With the Baby O?
Whiskey Before Breakfast
Whoa Mule

Composed music in the tradition
Old time music is based upon aural transmission of tunes whose authorship has been lost to antiquity and thus public domain repertoire. Some such tunes as have achieved such acceptance are widely known by most if not all fiddlers, even those who are not Old Time specialists.

  Wild Rose of the Mountain, J.P. Fraley
 Blackberry Blossom
 Orange Blossom Special
 Tennessee Waltz 
 Wagon Wheel

History and subgenres
Fiddlin' John Carson is one of the canonical historic figures in old time. Other famous and important figures include Fiddlin' Arthur Smith, Charlie Higgins and countless figures known only in local oral histories.

Old time fiddling has recognized regional variants which are distinguished from regional variants of bluegrass, Celtic and other styles. For instance, Texas Old Time fiddle, is distinct from Texas swing fiddle, Texas blues and Texas rock. It is Old Time, like its relatives in other regional genres (or subgenres) but it is a distinct form in its own right, according to its proponents. For instance, the Texas Old Time Fiddler's Association asserts the uniqueness, and superiority, of "Texas-style of old time fiddling". In an essay entitled The Origins of the Texas-Style of Traditional Old Time Fiddling, the organizations asserts that "the Texas fiddler avoids the repetition and monotony of the two-part Appalachian fiddle tune in favor of those tunes that are more complex and exceed the two-part limit".

Cajun fiddle is based on French-speaking Acadian culture in Louisiana and Texas and includes copious use of double stops and distinctive rhythms.

Preservation and propagation
Much of contemporary old time fiddling is taught at regional and national fiddler's meetups. The traditional authentic method of learning to play is based upon an oral tradition as with all folk music forms. Traditions are maintained by Old Time Fiddler's Associations throughout the US. America's Old Time Fiddler's Hall of Fame is maintained by the National Traditional Country Music Association located in Pioneer Music Museum in Anita, Iowas. Film is also a major means of preserving and propagating old time music.

Festivals, contests and fiddle camps
Breakin' Up Winter

The Fiddler's Grove Ole Time Fiddler's & Bluegrass Festival bills itself as the home of the oldest continuous old time fiddling contest in North America.

According to Winifred Ward, fiddle contests "evolved from being endurance fiddling events to playing a set number of tunes". Contests are highly evolved in Texas, where twin fiddling is also popular.

The national contest is held in June of each year in Weiser, Idaho.

Notable contemporary performers

Currently active old time fiddlers listed on David Lynch's The Old-Time Fiddler's Hall of Fame website include Kerry Blech and Bruce Greene.

Art and Charlie Stamper

With their home on the National Register of Historic Places, the Stamper family of Knott County Kentucky has been producing fiddling talent for generations. Bluegrass Hall of Famer, Art Stamper, played old-time bluegrass fiddle with some of the greatest names in the business, like Ralph and Carter Stanley, Bill Monroe, Larry Sparks, the Goins Brothers, Jim and Jesse. He was also instrumental in preserving and promoting the old-time roots of bluegrass as the genre developed.

Eldest brother Charlie Stamper never pursued music professionally as Art had, but he did learn the instrument first. He recently recorded his debut album at age 84. Appalshop/June Appal Records' "Glory to the Meeting House" consists of the first recordings ever released by Charlie. Many tunes were learned from his father Hiram Stamper, whose music has been archived by Berea College.

Says Charlie, "I was the first one in the family to play the fiddle and I was the first one to play on the radio. My dad [Hiram Stamper] played fiddle, banjo, and French harp, which is what we called a harmonica. I remember when I was five or six, I would sit on the floor between his legs as he played the fiddle, his big foot keeping time as it hit the floor."

Carolina Chocolate Drops

The Drops are an old-time string band from North Carolina but their music defies easy categorization. Their view of tradition is well expressed by a quote prominently featured on their website:

"Tradition is a guide, not a jailer. We play in an older tradition but we are modern musicians."

Genuine Negro Jig (2010) won the Grammy Award for Best Traditional Folk Album. Members Rhiannon Giddens, Dom Flemons, and Justin Robinson exchange instruments including fiddle, banjo, kazoo. Much of their repertoire, which is based on the traditional music of the Piedmont region of North and South Carolina, from the eminent African American old-time fiddler Joe Thompson, although they also perform old-time versions of some modern songs such as Blu Cantrell's R&B hit "Hit 'em Up Style (Oops!)."

Foghorn Stringband

Formerly known as Foghorn Leghorn, this Portland Oregon band holds itself out as "ass kickin' redneck" music and has solid critical and popular following as an authentic embodiment of the old time tradition. Their fiddler, Stephen 'Sammy' Lind, plays with no neck pad and allows the instrument to rest at a comfortably low position that would arouse the ire of any violin teacher. He also chokes the bow, doubling the violation of violinistic technique but clearly establishing his open tuning fiddle playing in the camp of fiddle rather than violin. Their repertoire is 100% Old Time and they staunchly rebuff anyone who mistakes their style with bluegrass.

New Lost City Ramblers

The New Lost City Ramblers is a contemporary old-time string band that formed in New York City in 1958 during the Folk Revival.  The founding members of the Ramblers, or NLCR, are Mike Seeger, John Cohen, and Tom Paley.  Tom Paley later left the group and was replaced by Tracy Schwarz.

The New Lost City Ramblers not only directly participated in the old-time music revival, but has continued to directly influence countless musicians who have followed.  They feature twin fiddles.

Partial list of notable OT Fiddlers
         
Charlie Acuff
Benny Thomasson
Joe Birchfield - Roan Mountain Hilltoppers
Bill Birchfield - Roan Mountain Hilltoppers
Bus Boyk
French Carpenter
Al Cherny
Jimmy Costa
Junior Daugherty
Clyde Davenport
Uncle Bob Douglas
Howdy Forrester  
A. A. Gray
G. B. Grayson
Ed Haley
Fiddlin' Sid Harkreader
Charlie Higgins
Bob Holt
Ben Jarrell
Tommy Jarrell
Earl Johnson
Harry Johnson
Hank Poitras
Bert Layne
Brad Leftwich
Stephen 'Sammy' Lind
Clark Kessinger
Uncle Jimmy McCarroll
Lester McCumbers
Kirk McGee
Clayton McMichen
Bruce Molsky
Frazier Moss
Fred Price
Red Clay Ramblers
Eck Robertson
Posey Rorer
Alvin Sanderson
Tracy Schwarz
Mike Seeger
Fiddlin' Arthur Smith
John Specker
Art Stamper
Charlie Stamper
Lowe Stokes
Uncle Bunt Stephens
Gid Tanner
Joe Thompson
Uncle Jimmy Thompson
Paul Warren
Melvin Wine
Marcus Martin
Luther Strong
W.H. Stepp
Joe Thompson

Old time fiddle set up

The fiddle used in playing Old Time fiddle tunes is essentially a violin which may be somewhat modified to accommodate Old Time playing technique. These modifications include:

 flattening the bridge slightly which makes it easier to perform rapid "double" shuffles which alternate between string pairs. This is not done in Irish, Scottish and most other fiddle styles.
 fiddle players in general more commonly use four fine tuners, where violinists may use only one, for the solid-steel E string.
 Old time fiddlers may dispense with chin rests entirely. Many don't use a shoulder rest, or use a rustic version thereof, such as a kitchen sponge held to the fiddle with a rubber band.

See also
 Western swing fiddle
 Cajun fiddle
 Canadian fiddle
 American fiddle

References

External links

Documentary "Why Old Time?"
Appalachian English
Meta index of resources
Nashville_Old_Time_Jukebox
Tons of fiddle tunes
Old Time Fiddlers Hall of Fame
Appalachian Traditional Music: A Short History
Sheet music, lyrics & midis for 200+ traditional old-time songs
Washington Oldtime Fiddlers Association
The Henry Reed Collection at the Library of Congress Collection of traditional fiddle tunes performed by Henry Reed of Glen Lyn, Virginia. Recorded by folklorist Alan Jabbour in 1966-67.
National traditional music association
Pegram Jam Old Time Music Resource

American folk music
Country music genres
Culture of the Southern United States
Appalachian culture
North American folk music
Performing arts pages with videographic documentation
Fiddle music